Jens Möckel (born 21 February 1988) is a German footballer who plays for NOFV-Oberliga Süd club FC An der Fahner Höhe.

External links
 
 

1988 births
Footballers from Leipzig
Living people
German footballers
Association football central defenders
FC Sachsen Leipzig players
FC Rot-Weiß Erfurt players
Dynamo Dresden players
3. Liga players
Oberliga (football) players